Qazanchi (also Romanized as Qazānchī; also known as Farānchī and Khazānchī) is a village in Miyan Darband Rural District, in the Central District of Kermanshah County, Kermanshah Province, Iran. At the 2006 census, its population was 2,290, in 565 families.

References 

Populated places in Kermanshah County